Phalaris californica is an uncommon species of grass known by the common name California canarygrass.

Distribution
It is native to the coastal hills and mountains of southern Oregon and northern and central California, where it grows mainly in moist areas, such as meadows.

Description
It is a perennial grass reaching maximum heights between one half and 1.5 meters. The inflorescence is up to 5 centimeters long and 3 wide, roughly oval, pointed at the tip and truncated at the base. The spikelets are hairy and as they ripen they turn shades of magenta to bright pink.

External links
Jepson Manual Treatment
USDA Plants Profile
Grass Manual Treatment
Photo gallery

californica
Native grasses of California
Flora of Oregon
Plants described in 1833
Flora without expected TNC conservation status